Xigang District is one of the seven districts of Dalian, Liaoning province, China, forming part of the urban core.

Administrative divisions
There are 5 subdistricts within the district.

Subdistricts:
Xianglujiao Subdistrict
Rixin Subdistrict
Bayi Road Subdistrict
Renmin Square Subdistrict
Baiyun Subdistrict

Education
The following secondary schools are within Xigang District:
Dalian No. 1 High School
Dalian No. 12 High School
Dalian No. 34 Middle School
Dalian No. 36 High School
Dalian No. 37 Middle School
High School Affiliated to Dalian College of Education

References

External links

 

Districts of Dalian